The Battle of Ray was fought between the Sasanians and the Rashidun Caliphate in 651. It was also part of the rivalry between the Ispahbudhan family and the Mihran family.

Background 
In 642/643, the Muslim Arabs had conquered Media, and continued to penetrate into the Iranian plateau. In 651, Farrukhzad, the spahbed of Khorasan, and minister of Yazdegerd III, mutinied and left for Tabaristan. On his way to Tabaristan, he met the Arab general Nu'aym near Qazvin, and made peace with him. He then agreed to aid the Arabs against his rival Siyavakhsh, who had murdered his father in 631.

Battle 
The combined Ispahbudhan-Arab army engaged in a night battle against Siyavakhsh's army at the foot of the mountain just outside Ray. Farrukhzad led some of Nu'aim's cavalry by a little-known route into the city, from whence they emerged to attack the defenders' rear, causing great slaughter. To set an example, Nu'aym ordered the destruction of the Old Town, which called "al-Atiqah" by the Arabs, (perhaps the aristocratic quarter of Ray). However, the town was later rebuilt by Farrukhzad, whom became the ruler of Ray.

References

Sources 

651
Ray
Ray
Muslim conquest of Persia
Ray
Ray